Aziz Ahmad is a Malaya footballer who plays for Penang as a striker.

Career Overview
He had successful career with Penang sided, went he won 6 titles with them.
He scored the winning goal when Penang defeated Singapore 3–2 in the 1953 Malaya Cup final in Ipoh. For a second year in a row, Penang defeated Singapore, this time with a scored of  3–0 in the final and Aziz scored the second goals. On 23 August 1958, Penang meet again singapore in the final and aziz scored an early lead. In replay match, Penang lifted the 1958 Malaya cup after defeated Singapore 2–0.

He also a part of the Malaya national team that play in the first ever edition, inaugural Pestabola Merdeka 1957.

Personal life
Namat and Shaharuddin, both his nephews, were also footballers.

Honours

Club
Penang
 Malaya Cup
Winners: 1953, 1954, 1958
 Malaya FAM Cup
Winners: 1955, 1956, 1957

References 

Malaysian footballers
Malaysia international footballers
Association football forwards
1930 births
Living people
Sportspeople from Penang